Sola may refer to:

Places
 Sola, Norway, a municipality in the county of Rogaland, Norway
 Sola, Togo, a village in Kara Region, Togo
 Sola, Vanuatu, the capital city of Torba Province, Vanuatu
 Sola (Sierra de Cubitas), a town in Camagüey Province, Cuba
 Soła, a river in Poland
 Sola (province), Occitan name for Soule in southwest France
 SoLA, an abbreviation for South Los Angeles

People

Surnamed
 Charles Michael Alexis Sola (1786–1857), Italian guitarist and composer mainly resident in England
 Josep Comas i Solà (1868–1937), Spanish astronomer
 Guillermo Solá (1929-2020), Chilean distance runner
 Enrique Sola (born 1986), Spanish footballer
 Sara Solá de Castellanos (1890-?), Argentine poet, novelist, playwright, lyricist
 Šola, a surname found in Croatia and Bosnia and Herzegovina (includes a list of people with the name)

Given named
 Sola, an alternate spelling of Sora (Japanese given name)
 Liu Sola (born 1955), Chinese composer, author and vocalist
 Sola Sierra (1935–1999), Chilean human rights activist

Fictional characters
 Sola Naberrie, older sister of Padme Amidala in the Star Wars prequel trilogy

Arts and entertainment
 Sola (manga), a 2006 Japanese manga and anime series

Music

Albums
 Saints of Los Angeles, a 2008 album by Mötley Crüe
 Sola, an album by Olga Tañón
 Sola, an album by Zayda y los Culpables

Songs
 "Sola" (Becky G song), 2016
 "Sola" (Francesca Michielin song), 2012
 "Sola" (Héctor el Father song), 2006
 "Sola" (J Balvin song), 2013
 "Sola", a song by Anuel AA
 "Sola", a song by Danna Paola from K.O.
 "Sola", a song by Daniela Romo from her album Amor Prohibido
 "Sola", a song by La India
 "Sola", a song by Irán Castillo from Tatuada en tus besos
 "Sola", a song by Ivy Queen from her 2015 EP Vendetta: Bachata
 "Sola", a song by Leslie Grace
 "Sola", a song by Luis Fonsi from Vida
 "Sola", a song by Jennifer Lopez from her album Como Ama una Mujer
 "Sola", a song by La Oreja de Van Gogh from A las cinco en el Astoria
 "Sola", a song by Manuel Turizo from ADN
 "Sola", a song by Mónica Naranjo from her eponymous album
 "Sola", a song by Playa Limbo

Other uses
 SOLA, School of Leadership Afghanistan
 Sola submachine gun, built by Societe Luxembourgeoise SA in Luxembourg between 1954 and 1957.
 Xperia sola, a cell phone by Sony
Aeschynomene aspera, a flowering plant from Asia with pithy stems
Five Solas, five Latin phrases summarizing the core beliefs of the Protestant Reformation

See also

 
 
 
 Sole (disambiguation)
 Sora (disambiguation)
 Solas (disambiguation)